SSDD, an initialism, may refer to:
 Single Sided, Double Density, a floppy disk format
 "System/Subsystem Design Description" / "System Segment Design Description" / "System Segment Design Document", part of the MIL-STD-498 military standard
 Serious Sam Double D, a 2011 video game by Mommy's Best Games and Devolver Digital
SSDD, a 2020 music video by BACI (german Rapper)